The 2018 Sporting Kansas City season is the twenty-third season of the team's existence in Major League Soccer and the eighth year played under the Sporting Kansas City moniker.

Current roster 

As  of October 10, 2018 

Player Movement
 In Per Major League Soccer and club policies terms of the deals do not get disclosed. Draft picks 
Draft picks are not automatically signed to the team roster. Only trades involving draft picks and executed after the start of 2018 MLS SuperDraft will be listed in the notes.

 Out 

 Loans 
Per Major League Soccer and club policies terms of the deals do not get disclosed.

 In 

 Out 

 Competitions 

Preseason
Kickoff times are in CST (UTC-06) unless shown otherwise

 Mobile Mini Sun Cup 

Kickoff times are in CST (UTC-06) unless shown otherwise

 Regular season 

Kickoff times are in CDT (UTC-05) unless shown otherwise

 MLS Cup Playoffs 

 Western Conference Semifinals

 Sporting Kansas City won 5-3 on aggregate.''

Conference Finals

Kickoff times are in CST (UTC-06) unless shown otherwise

2018 Lamar Hunt U.S. Open Cup

Kickoff times are in CDT (UTC-05) unless shown otherwise

Player statistics

Top scorers

As of November 10, 2018

Disciplinary record

As of September 9, 2018

References

Sporting Kansas City seasons
Sporting Kansas City
2018 Major League Soccer season
Sporting Kansas City